Reha Oğuz Türkkan (born 12 October 1920, Constantinople - died 18 January 2010)  was Turkish academic, journalist and a leading ideologue of Turkish racism. During his lifetime he published many books which focused on Turkish nationalism and Pan-Turkism. He was the grandnephew of Fakhri Pasha.

Early life and education 
He studied Law at the Ankara University and following his graduation, he worked at the Ministry of Justice.

Publishing 

He began to publish the outlet Ergenekon on the 10 November 1938. The Ergenekon appeared only a few times, but it was an influential outlet for Pan-Turkism as it depicted a Bozkurt (the Grey Wolf) on every front-page as well as the slogans "The Turkish race above everything" or "The Turkish race above every other race". He was a fierce opponent of a fascist or communist ideology and claimed that the first country founded by race was Turkey and that it was not Nazi Germany under Adolf Hitler. He also published two other Pan-Turkist magazines called the Bozkurt (1939) and the Gök Börü (1942). In those magazines he attempted to prove that the Turkish race was superior to other races due to the physical qualities and the historical accomplishments of the Turks.

Views 
He was in constant rivalry with Nihal Atsiz in defining the racial purity of Turkishness. Whereas Atsiz was more tolerant, Türkkan demanded a Turkish lineage of 9 generations. Nevertheless, he was convinced of the Turkish origin of the Native Americans and in 1999 he even wrote the book ‘Kızılderililer ve Türkler‘ (Native Americans and Turks) which focused on the subject. He led a group of racists who referred to themselves as the Bozkurtçu (In memory of the Grey Wolf) in the 1940s and was prosecuted but acquitted in the Racism Turanism trial. He defined Pan-Turkism as Turkish nationalism and as a vehicle for the establishment of a "national union" for all the Turkic people between Bulgaria to the Altai mountain range which then would strengthen Turkey as well.

Personal life 
He was the father of four children and was married twice. He died in January 2010 and was buried in the Zincirlikuyu Cemetery.

Works

Novels 

 4 İçtimai Mesele, Arkadaş Matbaası, İstanbul, 1939
 Türkçülüğe Giriş, Arkadaş Matbaası, İstanbul, 1940
 Irk Muhite Tabi midir?, İstanbul, 1941
 (Race et Milieu), Paris, 1942
 Les Summeriens et les Rites Funéraires, Paris, 1942
 Les Armes Serétes, Paris-La République, 1943
 Milliyetçiliğe Doğru, İstanbul, 1943
 Solcular ve Kızıllar, İstanbul, 1943
 Kızıl Faaliyet, İstanbul, 1944
 Tabutluktan Gurbete, İstanbul, 1950-1974-1985
 İleri Türkçülük ve Partiler, Rafet Zaimler, İstanbul, 1947
 Correlation in Twin Psychology, New York, 1951
 One America, New York, 1951
 Talking Turkey, New York, 1955
 Turkish Literature, New York, 1956
 Türks in Retrospect, New York, 1956
 Conditioned Learning, New York, 1964
 Revolution in Education (Programmed Instruction & Multi-Media), New York, 1967
 Progr. Instruction Based Courses (Atoms & Electrons, French I, How to Recognize Names & Faces) Chicago
 Turkish National Character, New York, 1971
 Kitle Halinde İşlenen Suçlarda Cezai Mesuliyet ve Kitle Psikolojisi, İstanbul, 1974
 Pre-Columbian Americans & Turks-Cultura Turcica, 1975
 Türk'ün dışarıda kalan mirası (Avrupa bölümü: film-çekim Balkanlar)
 Psikoloji, Yaykur, Ankara, 1976
 İkna Psikolojisi, Ankara, 1976
 Eğitim Teknolojisi Planı, Ankara, 1976
 Yenilenmiş Türk Destanları ve Hikâyeler - "6 Minik Kitap ve Müzik Kaseti", 1977

Magazines 

 Milli Kültür Magazine, 1975
 Kızıl Derililer ve Türkler, Hürriyer, 1996

Movies (production, direction and script) 

 To be Born Again, 1970
 Rions Ensemble (On Turkish humor), 1973
 First steps of the Moon (Live shot and interpretation of the first landing on the moon)
 Türk Çocukları İçin (Turkish culture for children abroad), 1974
 Öyle bir Özleyiş ki (Director Reha Oğuz Türkkan and Yücel Çakmaklı, Scenario Reha Oğuz Türkkan), 1977
 Stranger in Paradise (tourist documentary), 1977
 İpek Kadife, 1978
 Too Early for Death (NBC-N.Y.) (Ölüm için çok erken), 1954 (Scenario only)
 İçtiğimiz Çay, 1976 (Scenario only)
 Altın Yumurta, 1976 (Scenario only)

References 

Turkish writers
Pan-Turkists
Turkish nationalists
Ankara University Faculty of Law alumni
1920 births
2010 deaths
Bulgarian Turks in Turkey